Dharam Vir Ahluwalia (born October 20, 1952 in Fatehpur, Kaithal, India) is an Indian-born American theoretical physicist who has made significant contributions to physics of neutrino oscillations, gravitationally induced phases, interface of the gravitational and quantum realms, and mass dimension one fermions.  In 2019 he published Mass Dimension One Fermions .

Early life and education 
Dharam Vir was born in India. He is a US citizen, a permanent resident of New Zealand, and currently resides in Australia.

Awards and editorships 
He is recipient of a Gravity Research Foundation First Prize (1996, jointly with Christoph Burgard), Fourth Prize (1997), Third Prize (2004), and Fifth Prize (2000, with Gilma Adunas,  E. Rodriguez-Milla.

He is on the editorial boards of Modern Physics Letters A, the International Journal of Modern Physics A and the International Journal of Modern Physics D.

Selected publications 
Mass Dimension One Fermions (Cambridge Monographs on Mathematical Physics, Cambridge University Press, July 2019).
A new class of mass dimension one fermions.
Spin-half bosons with mass dimension three-half: Towards a resolution of the cosmological constant problem.
The Theory of Local Mass Dimension One Fermions of Spin One Half.
Neutrino mixing matrix.
Gravitationally induced neutrino-oscillation phases and neutrino oscillations as powerful energy transport mechanism for type-II supernova explosions.
GR and QM imply quantized spacetime.
Wave particle duality at the Planck scale.

References

1952 births
Living people
20th-century Indian physicists
Theoretical physicists
Delhi University alumni
Texas A&M University alumni
Ahluwalia